Tutte storie (English "All the Stories" or "All Stories") is an album by Italian singer Eros Ramazzotti. It was released by Sony BMG on 19 April 1993. Tutte storie, which has sold over four million copies, helped Ramazzotti get his contract with BMG International.

Track listing

Tutte storie
 "Cose della vita" (Cosas de la vida) – 4:48
 "A mezza via" – 5:37
 "Un'altra te" (Otra como tú) – 4:40
 "Memorie" – 4:50
 "In compagnia" – 4:38
 "Un grosso no" – 5:04
 "Favola" (Fábula) – 4:20
 "Non c'è più fantasia" – 3:51
 "Nostalsong" – 4:27
 "Niente di male" – 4:02
 "Esodi" – 4:31
 "L'ultima rivoluzione" – 4:13
 "Silver e Missie" – 4:25

Todo historias
"Cosas de la vida" – 4:48
"A medio camino" – 5:48
"Otra como tú" (Spanish version of "Un'altra te") – 4:41
"Recuerdos" – 5:23
"En compañía" (Spanish version of "In compagnia") – 4:43
"Un fuerte no" (Spanish version of "Un grosso no") – 5:39
"Fábula" – 4:37
"Ya no hay fantasía" (Spanish version of "Non c'è più fantasia") – 3:51
"Nostalsong" (Spanish version of "Nostalsong") – 4:30
"Nada de malo" (Spanish version of "Niente di male") – 4:05
"Éxodos" (Spanish version of "Esodi") – 4:36
"La última revolución" (Spanish version of "L'ultima revoluzione") – 4:13
"Silver y Missie" (Spanish version of "Silver e Missie") – 4:35

Charts

Weekly charts

Year-end charts

Sales and certifications

See also
List of best-selling albums in Chile
List of best-selling albums in Colombia
List of best-selling albums in Italy
List of best-selling albums in Portugal

References 

1993 albums
Eros Ramazzotti albums
Italian-language albums